Ganpatrao or Ganpat Rao is a Hindic given name that may refer to
Ganpatrao Deshmukh (1927–2021), Indian politician 
Ganpatrao Devji Tapase (1908–1991), Indian politician 
Ganpatrao Jadhav, Indian freedom activist, journalist and writer 
Ganpatrao Narayanrao Madiman (1879–1947), Indian businessman, banker and merchant
Ganpat Rao Gaekwad (1816–1856), Indian Maharaja
Janardan Ganpatrao Negi (born 1936), Indian geophysicist 
Prataprao Ganpatrao Jadhav, Indian politician 
Ramesh Ganpatrao Bundile, Indian politician

See also
Ganpat (disambiguation)

Indian masculine given names